Goldman Sachs Group, Inc. v. Arkansas Teacher Retirement System, 594 U.S. ___ (2021), was a 2021 decision of the Supreme Court of the United States related to securities fraud class actions.

Background 

A group of investors sued Goldman Sachs after the financial crisis of 2007–2008 to recover up to $13 billion in losses. In 2020, a panel of the United States Court of Appeals for the Second Circuit allowed the class action to proceed, by a 2–1 vote. Judge Richard J. Sullivan dissented.

Decision 

The Supreme Court issued its decision in June 2021, vacating the court of appeals' judgment and remanding for further proceedings. A unanimous court found that the presumption of classwide reliance established in Basic Inc. v. Levinson required the defendant's statements to be more than just generic guarantees. An 8–1 court, with Justice Sonia Sotomayor dissenting, found that the lower court had not adequately followed this framework, and remanded for further proceedings. A 6–3 court, with Justice Neil Gorsuch dissenting, joined by Justices Clarence Thomas and Samuel Alito, held that defendants have the burden of proof in rebutting the presumption of reliance.

References

External links 
 

2021 in United States case law
United States Supreme Court cases of the Roberts Court
United States securities case law
United States class action case law
Goldman Sachs
Great Recession in the United States
United States Supreme Court cases